Darreh-ye Mohammad Qoli (also Romanized as Darreh-ye Moḩammad Qolī) is a village in Shurab Rural District, Veysian District, Dowreh County, Lorestan Province, Iran. At the 2006 census, its population was 23, in 5 families.

References 

Towns and villages in Dowreh County